Pir Yusof (also Romanized as Pīr Yūsof) is a village in Pirsalman Rural District, in the Central District of Asadabad County, Hamadan Province, Iran. At the 2006 census, its population was 441, in 106 families.

References 

Populated places in Asadabad County